On May 16, 1815, Representative-Elect Jonathan Williams (DR) who'd been elected for , died before the start of the 14th Congress.  A special election was held on October 10 of that year to fill the vacancy left by his death.

Election results

Williams had been the sole Democratic-Republican elected to Pennsylvania's 1st district (a plural district with 4 seats), and so with Sergeant's win, all four of the 1st district's seats were held by Federalists.  Sergeant took his seat in the Congress on December 6, 1815

See also
List of special elections to the United States House of Representatives

References

Pennsylvania 1815 01
Pennsylvania 1815 01
1815 01
Pennsylvania 01
United States House of Representatives 01
United States House of Representatives 1815 01